Cray is the surname of:

 Chick Cray (1921-2008), English cricketer
 Dean Cray (born 1958), American politician
 Eric Cray (born 1988), Filipino track and field athlete
 Fred Cray (born 1957), American artist
 Graham Cray (born 1947), British retired Anglican bishop
 Robert Cray (born 1953), American blues musician
 Seymour Cray (1925–1996), American computer scientist and supercomputing pioneer

See also
 McCray